Filippo Bandinelli (born 29 March 1995) is an Italian professional footballer who plays as a midfielder for Serie A club Empoli.

Club career
He made his professional debut in the Serie B for Latina on 27 October 2015 in a game against Ternana.

On 2 August 2018, Bandinelli joined to Benevento on loan until 30 June 2019.

On 13 July 2019, he signed with Empoli.

References

External links
 

1995 births
Living people
Footballers from Florence
Association football midfielders
Italian footballers
Latina Calcio 1932 players
A.C. Perugia Calcio players
Benevento Calcio players
Empoli F.C. players
Serie A players
Serie B players